Rino Albertarelli (8 June 1908 – 21 September 1974) was an Italian comics artist and illustrator.

He was born in Cesena. He moved to Milan in 1928, debuting in 1935 for the comics magazines ArgentoVivo! and L'Audace. Two years later he moved to Mondadori, for which he created his most famous character, Kit Carson, as well as the series Dottor Faust and Gino e Gianni. He also worked on "Il Corsaro Nero" for Paperino e altre avventure. After the war he slowed his activities as a comic artist, only making a few Emilio Salgari's adaptations for the magazine Salgari and collaborating with some French magazines.

In the 1950s Albertarelli abandoned comics to focus on his activity as illustrator. After a long hiatus, he returned to comics in 1973 with Daim Press' series I protagonisti del West (also known just as I protagonisti), with which he collaborated until his death in Milan in 1974. The series was eventually completed by Sergio Toppi.

References

External links
 Page at Franco Fossati's foundation website

1908 births
1974 deaths
People from Cesena
Italian comics artists